Leif Larsen (born 30 September 1942) is a former Danish cyclist. He competed in the team pursuit at the 1960 Summer Olympics.

References

External links
 

1942 births
Living people
Danish male cyclists
Olympic cyclists of Denmark
Cyclists at the 1960 Summer Olympics
Sportspeople from Odense